GiveDirectly is a nonprofit organization operating in East Africa that helps families living in extreme poverty by making unconditional cash transfers to them via mobile phone. GiveDirectly transfers funds primarily to people in Kenya, Uganda, and Rwanda.

History 

GiveDirectly originated as a giving circle started by Paul Niehaus, Michael Faye, Rohit Wanchoo, and Jeremy Shapiro, students at MIT and Harvard, based on their research into philanthropy.  In 2012 they formalized their operation into GiveDirectly.

In December 2012, GiveDirectly received a $2.4M Global Impact Award from Google. In June 2014, the founders of GiveDirectly announced plans to create a for-profit technology company, Segovia, aimed at improving the efficiency of cash transfer distributions in the developing world. In August 2015, GiveDirectly received a $25M grant from Good Ventures.

In April 2016, GiveDirectly announced a $30M initiative to test universal basic income in order to "try to permanently end extreme poverty across dozens of villages and thousands of people in Kenya by guaranteeing them an ongoing income high enough to meet their basic needs" and, if it works, pave the way for implementation in other regions. The initiative launched in November 2017 and is set to run for 12 years.

In 2017, GiveDirectly applied their model for the first time in the U.S., distributing cash-loaded debit cards to residents of Rose City, Texas, following Hurricane Harvey.

In 2022, after reaching their $1 billion funding target, GiveDirectly appointed British Politician and diplomat Rory Stewart as their President.

Operations

COVID-19 support
GiveDirectly set up two emergency response program to the COVID-19 pandemic: one in the US, for which it has raised US$118 million, and one in African countries, for which it has raised US$76 million. The organization has sent cash relief to 116,000 families in the US and 342,000 families in Kenya, Liberia, Malawi, Rwanda and Togo.

In Togo it built on an existing government of Togo cash transfer program called Novissi. Money is paid via mobile money technology, with beneficiaries withdrawing money at local shops. GiveDirectly helped expand the program to certain rural areas where the government found it difficult to identify the poorest beneficiaries. The machine learning algorithm First, it finds the poorest villages by analyzing  roof material, sizes of farm plots and the presence of paved or unpaved roads through satellite images. Second, it finds the poorest individuals in a village by analyzing their mobile phone data like lengths and frequency of phone calls, number of inbound versus outbound calls, and amount of mobile data used.

Basic income experiment 
In April 2016 GiveDirectly announced  a 12-year experiment to test  a universal basic income on a rural region in Western Kenya. More than 26,000 people will receive some type of cash transfer, with more than 6,000 receiving a long-term basic income.
 Long-term basic income: 40 villages with recipients receiving roughly $0.75 per adult per day, delivered monthly for 12 years
 Short-term basic income: 80 villages with recipients receiving the same monthly amount, but only for 2 years
 Lump sum payments: 80 villages with recipients receiving a lump sum payment equivalent to the total value of  the short-term stream
 Control group: 100 villages not receiving cash transfers

In November 2019, an economics paper on the GiveDirectly experiment found each dollar from cash transfers increased local economic activity by $2.6.

Funding 
GiveDirectly collects donations from private donors as well as foundations. In 2015, the organization received $25 million  from Good Ventures, a private foundation started by Facebook co-founder Dustin Moskovitz and his wife Cari Tuna.

Reception

GiveWell reviews

GiveDirectly has been named one of  GiveWell 'top rated' charities for 2012, through 2020.

Reception by development economists 

After the release of GiveDirectly's impact self-evaluation in October 2013, World Bank economist David McKenzie praised the robustness of the study's design and the clear disclosure of the study lead's conflict of interest, but raised two concerns:

 The use of self-reporting made the results hard to interpret and rely on (this is a feature of any study that attempted to measure consumption).
 The division of the sample into so many  groups meant that there was less statistical power to clearly decide which group had better outcomes.

Chris Blattman, an academic in development economics, with a particular focus on randomized controlled trials, also blogged about the study. He expressed two main reservations:

 The observer-expectancy effect, where the people being asked questions may be subtly influenced in their answers by the experimenter's expectations.
 The lack of clear positive effect on long-term outcomes, as well as the lack of increased spending on health and education.

See also
 Effective altruism

References

External links

 GiveDirectly website
 Innovations for Poverty Action page on GiveDirectly
 GiveWell official review of GiveDirectly

Charities based in New York City
Foreign charities operating in Kenya
Foreign charities operating in Uganda
Organizations associated with effective altruism